Northeast Community is a neighborhood within the city limits of Tampa, Florida. As of the 2010 census the neighborhood had a population of 1,663. The ZIP Codes serving the neighborhood are 33604, 33610, and 33617.

Geography
Northeast Community boundaries are roughly the Hillsborough River to the north, 40th Street to the west, Hillsborough Avenue to the south and Del Rio to the east.

Demographics
Source: Hillsborough County Atlas

At the 2010 census there were 1,663 people and 613 households residing in the neighborhood. The population density was  5,195/mi2. The racial makeup of the neighborhood was 15% White, 78% African American, 0% Native American, 2% Asian, 4% from other races, and 5% from two or more races. Hispanic or Latino of any race were 12%.

Of the 613 households 33% had children under the age of 18 living with them, 26% were married couples living together, 35% had a female householder with no husband present, and 7% were non-families. 25% of households were made up of individuals.

The age distribution was 30% under the age of 18, 24% from 18 to 34, 19% from 35 to 49, 18% from 50 to 64, and 11% 65 or older. For every 100 females, there were 82.1 males.

The per capita income for the neighborhood was $12,716. About 31% of the population were below the poverty line, including 20.0% of those under age 18 and 9.0% of those age 65 or over.

Transportation
The community is served primarily by two HARTline bus lines:

Line 5 - Downtown Tampa to U.A.T.C. (via 40th Street)
Line 34 - Netpark to Hanley/Waters Plaza ''(via Hillsborough Avenue)

See also
Neighborhoods in Tampa, Florida

References

External links
Northeast Community profile and demographic information

Neighborhoods in Tampa, Florida